Asociación Deportiva Municipal Turrialba Club de Fútbol is a Costa Rican football club, that currently plays in the Costa Rican Liga de Ascenso.

History
Founded in 1940, Turrialba made it to the Segunda División in 1964 and won promotion to the Primera División in 1965. During the 1960s and 1970s they were known as a yo-yo club, changing divisions frequently. Their most recent spell in the Primera División was between 1991 and 1997, when they were relegated after a 1–0 defeat by Puntarenas. Since its foundation, it has been named Turrialba FC, Asociación Deportiva Turrialba and Municipal Turrialba. They have totalled 16 seasons in the top tier.

In December 2014, former Cartaginés chairman Thelvin Cabezas acquired the Turrialba franchise in a bid to lead the club back to the Primera División. They were renamed Turrialba F.C. and Uruguyan Carlos del Toro was named as manager.

Stadium
Municipal Turrialba plays its home games at the Rafael Ángel Camacho Cordero stadium, which is located in the central district of the canton of Turrialba.

The property is municipal property and is under the administration of the Cantonal Sports and Recreation Committee of Turrialba.

It bears that name in honor of a great sports leader from the Turrialba canton.

Honours

National
Segunda División de Costa Rica: 4
 1964, 1969, 1972, 1974

Current squad
As of January 26, 2023

References

External links

Football clubs in Costa Rica
Association football clubs established in 1940
1940 establishments in Costa Rica